Phannias ben Samuel (in Hebrew: פנחס בן שמואל Pinhas ben Shmuel) (c. 70 CE) was the last Jewish High Priest, the 83rd since Aaron. He was from the 'tribe' of Eniachin (priestly order Jachin) and did not originate from one of the six families from whom high priests had traditionally been chosen. He was a leader of revolutionary forces and died during the destruction of Herod's Temple in 70 CE.

In order to see how far their power extended, the Zealots

References

1st-century High Priests of Israel
70 deaths
Judean people
Jewish rebels
Year of birth unknown